Trading Twilight for Daylight is the first full-length album from the American band Great Northern. It was recorded in Mathias Schneeberger's "Donner & Blitzen" studio in Arcadia, California.

Track listing

References

2007 debut albums
Great Northern (indie band) albums